Gerrini is a tribe of water striders containing over 160 species in 12 genera.

Genera
 Aquarius
 Gerris
 Gerrisella
 Gigantometra
 Limnogonus
 Limnometra
 Limnoporus
 Neogerris
 Tenagogerris
 Tenagogonus
 Tenagometra
 Tenagometrella

References 

 
Gerrinae
Hemiptera tribes